New Vibes is a U.S. Virgin Islands soccer club based in St. Thomas, U.S. Virgin Islands that regularly competes in the U.S. Virgin Islands Championship, and has had success in the tournament. The team competes in the St. Thomas & St. John's Soccer League and is one of the most successful clubs in St. Thomas and in the U.S. Virgin Islands.

Honors 
 U.S. Virgin Islands Association Club Championship
 Winners (1): 2022-23
 St Thomas Soccer League
 Winners: 2008–09
 Runners-up: 2010–11

References 

Soccer clubs in the United States Virgin Islands